Kızılca is a village in Bozyazı district of Mersin Province, Turkey. It is situated in Toros Mountains to the north of Bozyazı. The population of the village was 221. as of 2012.

References

Villages in Bozyazı District